James Mervyn Richards (born 11 December 1975) is a Welsh rugby union player. Richards played club rugby for Bedford, Worcester Warriors, Newport RFC, Gwent Dragons, Harlequins and Leicester Tigers. He recently helped by coaching at Beckenham RFC specifically with the forwards.

Notes

1975 births
Living people
Harlequin F.C. players
Leicester Tigers players
Rugby union players from Pembrokeshire
Welsh rugby union coaches
Welsh rugby union players